In enzymology, a gluconokinase is an enzyme that catalyzes the chemical reaction

ATP + D-gluconate  ADP + 6-phospho-D-gluconate

Thus, the two substrates of this enzyme are ATP and D-gluconate, whereas its two products are ADP and 6-phospho-D-gluconate.

This enzyme belongs to the family of transferases, specifically those transferring phosphorus-containing groups (phosphotransferases) with an alcohol group as acceptor.  The systematic name of this enzyme class is ATP:D-gluconate 6-phosphotransferase. Other names in common use include gluconokinase (phosphorylating), and gluconate kinase.  This enzyme participates in pentose phosphate pathway.

Structural studies

References

 
 
 
 

EC 2.7.1
Enzymes of known structure